The Stone Sculptures on Yaowang Mountain, or Bhaiṣajyarāja, are located on Yaowang Mountain 1.5 kilometers east of the Yaoxian county seat, in Shaanxi, China.

There are 200 stone tablets at Yaowang Mountain, erected during the past dynasties; seven grottoes of the Sui and Tang dynasties; as well as Buddhist statues from the Northern Wei Dynasty to the Tang Dynasty eras. Bhaiṣajyarāja is also a name of the so-called Medicine Buddha in Mahāyāna Buddhism

See also
List of Buddhist Architecture in China

External links
Tongchuan Travel China: Stone Sculptures on Yaowang Mountain

Major National Historical and Cultural Sites in Shaanxi
Chinese Buddhist grottoes